is a professional shogi player and a chess FIDE Master. His master is Tatsuya Futakami. He is the only person to simultaneously hold seven major professional shogi titles at the same time and is also the only person to qualify as a lifetime title holder for seven major titles. In January 2018, Habu became the first professional shogi player to be awarded Japan's People's Honour Award.

Early life 
Yoshiharu Habu was born in Tokorozawa, Saitama in 1970 and moved to Hachioji, Tokyo before entering kindergarten. Habu first encountered shogi in his first year of elementary school, when his classmates taught him how the shogi pieces move. He was so fascinated by the game that his mother entered him in a shogi tournament held at the Hachioji Shogi Club in the summer of 1978. Although Habu was eliminated during the preliminary rounds with a record of 1 win and 2 losses, his parents took him to the shogi club every weekend from October 1978. Habu improved so rapidly that he was promoted to amateur 5-dan in October 1981 at the age of eleven.

During his elementary school days, Habu regularly participated in regional and national shogi tournaments, mainly for children. At these tournaments, Habu played against several children of the same age who also became professional players, including Toshiyuki Moriuchi, Yasumitsu Sato and Manabu Senzaki.

In April 1982, Habu won the 7th . He expressed his desire to become a professional player and asked advice from Katsuyasu Nakajima, the owner of the Hachioji Shogi Club and a student of Tatsuya Futakami. Habu applied for admission into the Japan Shogi Association's apprentice school as Futakami's student and was accepted as a member in 1982.

Shogi professional 
Habu became a 4-dan professional in 1985 at the age of 14. He was the third junior high school kid professional in shogi history following Hifumi Kato and Koji Tanigawa. In 1989, at the age of 19, Habu 6-dan won the Ryūō championship, defeating Akira Shima who led a 4-person shogi study group "Shimaken" in which Habu himself took part. This was the first time Habu won one of the seven major titles making him, at the time, the youngest titleholder ever. Although he lost the Ryūō title to Tanigawa the following year, Habu won the Kiō championship four months later in 1991. Since then he has held at least one of the seven major titles every year since then, and according to custom of the titleholder system he has, therefore, never been referred to by his dan ranking since winning that first championship in 1989.

Accumulating three wins in major championships (Ryūō in 1989, Kiō in 1991 and 1992), Habu actually did qualify for promotion to 9-dan in March 1992, but the existing promotion rules required him to be promoted to 8-dan first and then to wait one year before his next promotion. He was officially promoted to 9-dan on April 1, 1994.

In 1992 Habu won the Ōza championship defeating Bungo Fukusaki to hold two titles (Kiō and Ōza) simultaneously. He went on to hold the Ōza title for 19 terms in a row.
In 1996 (February 14 to July 30), Habu became the first professional to ever hold all seven major titles (Meijin, Ryūō, Kisei, Ōi, Ōza, Kiō, and Ōshō) at the same time, a remarkable feat that has not been duplicated since.

In July 2012, Habu won his 81st shogi title overall when he won in the Kisei title, becoming 1st on the all-time title-winners list, and surpassing the 80 of Yasuharu Ōyama.

In June 2014, Habu defeated the defending Meijin Toshiyuki Moriuchi four games to none to become the 72nd Meijin.  Habu lost his Meijin title to Moriuchi in 2011 (69th Meijin match) and was unable to defeat Moriuchi and regain the title in both 2012 (70th Meijin match) and 2013 (71st Meijin match). By defeating Moriuchi, Habu not only moved into a tie with both Moriuchi and Yoshio Kimura for third place on the all time Meijin winner's list, he also became the first person the recapture the title for the third time.

In November 2014, Habu won his 1300 official game, becoming the fourth player to do so, the youngest player to do so (44 years and 1 month) and the fastest player to do since turning professional (28 years and 11 months). Habu's win came in his 1801 game as a professional and his winning percentage of 72.3 percent at the time is the all-time highest of any professional player to reach 1300 wins to date.

In December 2017, Habu defeated defending champion Akira Watanabe to win the 30th Ryūō title. It was Habu's seventh Ryūō title overall which qualified him for the title of Lifetime Ryūō. It also made Habu the first shogi professional to qualify for lifetime titles in seven major titles.

On January 5, 2018, Habu became the first shogi professional to be awarded Japan's People's Honor Award. In November 2018, it was announced that he was also awarded the Medal with Purple Ribbon.

On November 21, 2018, Habu became the seventh shogi professional to play 2000 official games. At age 48 years and 1 month, Habu is the youngest to achieve the feat. He also accomplished it in 32 years and 11 months since obtaining professional status, thus becoming the fastest to do so. Furthermore, his overall winning percentage of .709 is also the highest among those who have previously reached the milestone.

On December 21, 2018, Habu lost the 31st Ryūō title to challenger Akihito Hirose 4 games to 3. The loss of the Ryūō title marked the first time in 27 years that Habu was a not one of professional shogi's major titleholders. A few days after losing the Ryūō title, the Japan Shogi Association announced that Habu had expressed his desire to be officially referred to as "Habu 9-dan" instead of as "Ex-Ryūō Habu", the way Ex-Ryūō champions can choose to be referred to as throughout the year following their loss of the title.

Habu defeated Masataka Gōda on March 17, 2019, to win the 68th NHK Cup tournament. It was the eleventh time Habu won the tournament, and also the 45th non-major title championship of his career, which broke the previous record of forty-four championships he shared with Ōyama.

On June 4, 2019, Habu defeated Takuya Nagase to become the shogi professional with the most victories of all time with 1,434 wins. Habu tied Ōyama's record of 1433 career wins a little over a week earlier on May 23, but then lost his next game and his first chance to break the tie on May 30. Habu's 1,434 win came in his 2,027 game as a shogi professional and gave him an overall winning percentage of 0.708.

In 2022, Habu was demoted to B1 class after 29 consecutive terms ranked A class or higher. On June 16, 2022, in the first round of the 81st Meijin B1 ranking league, Habu defeated Takayuki Yamasaki to become the first shogi professional with 1,500 wins, extending his record for most wins by a shogi professional and giving him an overall winning percentage of 0.696. For this achievement, Habu was awarded the newly-created .

Habu won all six of his games in the 72nd Ōshō Challenger League (SeptemberNovember 2022) to earn the right to challenger Sōta Fujii for the later's Osho title in the 72nd Ōshō title match (JanuaryMarch 2023). It was the first meeting between the two in a major title match. The match was tied at two wins apiece after four games, but Fujii won the next two games to win the match 4 games to 2.

Playing style 
Habu is an outstanding player of Static Rook strategies in both attack and defense, whether in early fight or slow game circumstances, but has also used Ranging Rook openings on occasion. Shogi professional Kiyokazu Katsumata has described Habu's as "a man who plays by applying the strong points of successive great masters as the circumstances demand, a man who combines all of the virtues of all the great masters".

Habu's favorite piece is the silver, which he finds vital for both attack and defense. His winning percentage when dropping golds and silvers on the squares 23 and 83 (or at 87 and 27 when playing White) is said to be high even though winning after such drops is generally considered to be quite difficult. For this reason, these squares are referred to by some in the shogi world as "Habu's zone".

He is well known for playing superb moves in disadvantageous positions in the endgame, with peculiar brinkmate sequences that other players seem unable to come up with, a characteristic that many young players called "Habu's magic", a label under which he has published a series of books.

His long time rival Toshiyuki Moriuchi said of him: "His greatness lies in that as those around him get stronger, he also gets stronger. He is completely obsessed with not letting there be any  big difference in playing strength between himself and other shogi professionals."

Promotion history 
The promotion history of Habu is as follows:
 6-kyu: December 2, 1982
 5-kyu: February 2, 1983 (6 wins, 3 losses)
 4-kyu: March 28, 1983 (6 wins, no losses)
 3-kyu: May 11, 1983 (6 wins, no losses)
 2-kyu: July 7, 1983 (6 wins, no losses)
 1-kyu: August 24, 1983 (6 wins, no losses)
 1-dan: January 11, 1984 (12 wins, 4 losses)
 2-dan: September 10, 1984 (14 wins, 5 losses)
 3-dan: April 25, 1985 (12 wins, 4 losses)
 4-dan: December 12, 1985 (13 wins, 4 losses)
 5-dan: April 1, 1988 (for being promoted to Class C1 of Meijin ranking leagues)
 6-dan: October 1, 1989 (for being the Ryu-oh challenger)
 7-dan: October 1, 1990 (for being the Ryu-oh title holder, but needed to wait one year after 6-dan promotion)
 8-dan: April 1, 1993 (for being promoted to Class A of the Meijin ranking leagues)
 9-dan: April 1, 1994 (Qualified for rank in 1993 after holding a major title for three periods (years), but needed to wait one year after of 8-dan promotion before promoted to 9-dan)

Major titles and other championships

Major titles
There are eight major titles in shogi.  Below is a list of number of times and years Habu has won each title.
 

Lifetime titles (qualified for, but awarded upon retirement or death): Lifetime Meijin, Lifetime Ryūō, Lifetime Kisei, Lifetime Ōi, Lifetime Ōza, Lifetime Kiō, Lifetime Ōshō. As a result of having Lifetime awards for all 7 titles, Habu is called the Lifetime Seven Crown (永世七冠) holder.

Holds the record number of title match victories for the following titles: Kisei (tied with Ōyama and Nakahara), Ōi, Ōza, Kiō

Holds the record number of consecutive title match victories for the following titles: Kisei, Ōza, Kiō

Other tournaments
In addition to major titles, Habu has won the following non-title tournaments.

Lifetime titles: Lifetime NHK Cup Champion

Note: Tournaments marked with an asterisk (*) are no longer held.

Awards
Habu has received the following awards in recognition of his accomplishments throughout his career. The Annual Shogi Awards are awarded by the Japan Shogi Association to its members each year in recognition of performance during official play throughout the previous professional shogi year or shogi (April 1 to March 31). "Other awards" includes those awarded by the JSA for career accomplishments and those awarded governmental organizations, etc. for contributions made to Japanese society.

Annual Shogi Awards
14th Annual Awards (April 1986 — March 1987): Best Winning Percentage, Best New Player
15th Annual Awards (April 1987 — March 1988): Best Winning Percentage, Most Games Won, Fighting-spirit
16th Annual Awards (April 1988 — March 1989): Player of the Year, Best Winning Percentage, Most Games Won, Most Games Played, Most Consecutive Games Won
17th Annual Awards (April 1989 — March 1990): Player of the Year, Best Winning Percentage, Most Games Won, Most Games Played, Most Consecutive Games Won
19th Annual Awards (April 1991 — March 1992): Fighting-spirit
20th Annual Awards (April 1992 — March 1993): Player of the Year, Best Winning Percentage, Most Games Won, Most Games Played, Most Consecutive Games Won 
21st Annual Awards (April 1993 — March 1994): Player of the Year
22nd Annual Awards (April 1994 — March 1995): Player of the Year, Most Games Won
23rd Annual Awards (April 1995 — March 1996): Player of the Year, Best Winning Percentage, Most Games Won, Special Award
24th Annual Awards (April 1996 — March 1997): Player of the Year 
26th Annual Awards (April 1998 — March 1999): Player of the Year, Most Games Played
27th Annual Awards (April 1999 — March 2000): Player of the Year
28th Annual Awards (April 2000 — March 2001): Player of the Year, Best Winning Percentage, Most Games Won, Most Games Played, Most Consecutive Games Won 
29th Annual Awards (April 2001 — March 2002): Player of the Year
30th Annual Awards (April 2002 — March 2003): Player of the Year, Most Games Won, Most Games Played
32nd Annual Awards (April 2004 — March 2005): Player of the Year, Most Games Won, Most Games Played
33rd Annual Awards (April 2005 — March 2006): Player of the Year, Most Games Played, Most Consecutive Games Won 
34th Annual Awards (April 2006 — March 2007): Excellent Player, Game of the Year 
35th Annual Awards (April 2007 — March 2008): Player of the Year, Most Games Won, Most Games Played, Game of the Year 
36th Annual Awards (April 2008 — March 2009): Player of the Year, Game of the Year 
37th Annual Awards (April 2009 — March 2010): Player of the Year
38th Annual Awards (April 2010 — March 2011): Player of the Year, Most Games Won 
39th Annual Awards (April 2011 — March 2012): Player of the Year, Most Games Won, Most Games Played 
40th Annual Awards (April 2012 — March 2013): Excellent Player, Most Games Won, Most Games Played, Game of the Year, Special Award
41st Annual Awards (April 2013 — March 2014): Excellent Player, Most Games Won, Most Games Played, Game of the Year
42nd Annual Awards (April 2014 — March 2015): Player of the Year, Game of the Year
43rd Annual Awards (April 2015 — March 2016): Player of the Year, Special Game of the Year
44th Annual Awards (April 2016 — March 2017): Excellent Player
45th Annual Shogi Awards (April 2017 — March 2018): Player of the Year, Game of the Year
46th Annual Shogi Awards (April 2018March 2019): Game of the Year

Other awards
1994: Tokyo Resident Culture Honor Award (Awarded by the Governor of Tokyo in recognition of cultural achievements by a Tokyoite)
1996: Prime Minister's Award (Awarded by then Japanese Prime Minister Ryūtarō Hashimoto in recognition of becoming the first person to hold all seven major shogi titles at the same time.
1999: Shogi Honor Award (Awarded by the JSA in recognition of winning 600 official games as a professional)
2003: Shogi Honor Fighting-spirit Award (Awarded by JSA in recognition of winning 800 official games as a professional)
2007: Special Shogi Honor Award (Awarded by the JSA in recognition of winning 1,000 official games as a professional)
2008: 56th Kikuchi Kan Prize (Awarded by the publishing company Bungei Shunju in recognition of cultural achievements) 
2010: 25 Years Service Award (Awarded by the JSA in recognition of being an active professional for twenty-five years)
2018: People's Honor Award
2018: Medal with Purple Ribbon
2022: Special Shogi Honor Fighting Spirit Award (Awarded by JSA in recognition of winning 1,500 official games as a professional)

Year-end shogi prize money rankings
Since 1993, Habu has finished at the top of the year-end prize money rankings a total of 23 times (1993–96, 1998-2012, 2014–16, 2018), second twice (1997 and 2013), third once (2017), fifth twice (2019 and 2021) and sixth once (2020). All amounts are given in Japanese yen and consist of tournament winnings and other game fees received during the calendar year (January 1 to December 31). Habu did not finish in the Top Ten in 2022, marking the first time he did not do so since 1993.

1993: ¥100,630,000
1994: ¥112,970,000
1995: ¥165,970,000
1996: ¥161,450,000
1997: ¥101,820,000 
1998: ¥114,660,000  
1999: ¥78,720,000
2000: ¥105,950,000
2001: ¥115,190,000
2002: ¥110,480,000
2003: ¥129,100,000
2004: ¥112,720,000
2005: ¥103,910,000
2006: ¥93,760,000
2007: ¥81,320,000
2008: ¥107,110,000
2009: ¥112,780,000
2010: ¥115,760,000
2011: ¥98,860,000
2012: ¥91,750,000
2013: ¥72,810,000
2014: ¥114,990,000
2015: ¥119,000,000
2016: ¥91,500,000
2017: ¥50,070,000
2018: ¥75,520,000
2019: ¥39,990,000
2020: ¥24,910,000
2021: ¥32,360,000

Chess professional 

Habu is also one of the best chess players in Japan, with a peak Elo rating of 2415 in February 2014.

In November 2014, he played former World Chess Champion Garry Kasparov in an exhibition match sponsored by the Japanese company Dwango. The two played two 25-minute rapid games with Habu losing both.

Personal life 
In March 1996, Habu married actress and singer  at Hato no Mori Hachiman Shrine in Sendagaya, Tokyo, not far from the head office of the Japan Shogi Association. The two had met for the first time in September 1994 and officially announced their engagement in July 1995. It was reported that 80 police officers were assigned to the ceremony due to the popularity of the two. , they have two daughters.

Publications
Habu has written numerous books, articles, etc. on shogi and various other topics. The vast majority of these are in Japanese, but there are some written in English.

Video games
 Habu Meijin no Omoshiro Shōgi - Super Famicom video game
 Saikyō Habu Shōgi - Nintendo 64 video game
 Habu Yoshiharu Shogi de Kitaeru: Ketsudanryoku DS - Nintendo DS video game
 i HABU Shogi - iPhone/iPod

Notes

References

External links
 
 Yoshiharu Habu performs an IM norm in Paris: The 4th Saint Quentin en Yvelines Chess Tournament (15-22 April 2001)
 ShogiHub: Professional Player Info · Habu, Yoshiharu
 YouTube: Aesthetics of game : shogi, Japanese traditional culture Interview with Yoshiharu Habu

1970 births
Living people
Japanese shogi players
Japanese chess players
Professional shogi players from Saitama Prefecture
Professional shogi players from Tokyo Metropolis
Chess FIDE Masters
Professional shogi players
Meijin (shogi)
Ryūō
Kisei (shogi)
Ōi (shogi)
Ōza (shogi)
Kiō
Ōshō
Lifetime titles
People's Honour Award winners
Recipients of the Medal with Purple Ribbon
People from Hachiōji, Tokyo
People from Tokorozawa, Saitama
Shinjin-Ō
Ginga